Ravnje can refer to:
 Ravnje, Slovenia, a village in Slovenia
 Ravnje (Sremska Mitrovica), a village in Sremska Mitrovica, Serbia
 Ravnje (Valjevo), a village in Valjevo, Serbia